David Christopher Davies (1827 – 19 September 1885) was an English geologist and mining engineer. He was born and grew up in the Oswestry area, and began his career as the apprentice of a local ironmonger. As a member of the Oswestry Naturalists' Field Club he developed an interest in the geology of the area, and the age of 30 set himself up as a mining engineer, working mainly in north Wales, but also in France and Germany.

His geological writings include his "Guide to Llangollen" (which had reached its 3rd edition by 1864), "A Treatise on Slate and Slate Quarrying in North Wales" (1878 and 1880), "A Treatise on Metalliferous Minerals and Mining" (1880), "A Treatise on Earth Minerals and Mining" (1884), and a number of papers published in the Geological Magazine, the Proceedings of the Geologists' Association, and the Quarterly Journal of the Geological Society.

Davies was a Fellow of the Geological Society. A lay preacher, he also published a volume of sermons, The Christ for all the Ages.

He died on his way home from Norway in 1885.

References

Further reading
.

Welsh geologists
Welsh writers
1827 births
1885 deaths
Fellows of the Geological Society of London
British mining engineers
People from Oswestry